Pigtails is the third studio album by Dutch-Australian children's music performer, Franciscus Henri. It was originally issued in 1976 by Crest Records. The album was reissued twice between 1990 and 2010.

Track listing
All songs are traditional, unless otherwise shown

Crest Records, catalogue no. CRTMB003

References

1975 albums
Franciscus Henri albums